Beijing Dream (Chinese: 北京梦 Běijīng mèng) is a 2002 Mandarin Chinese-language rock album by Thin Man band. It was released on Jingwen Records on 15 July 2002.

Track listing
 让我替你疯狂 Let me drive you crazy
 老师，我想对你说 F*** Teacher
 向远方 To a Place Far away
 蒙古战车 Mongol War Machine
 把爱全给你 Give All my Love to You
 你明白 You Understand
 因为你出现 Because You Appeared
 圈 Group
 北京梦 Beijing Dream
 希望 Hope
 新年 Newyear

References

2002 albums
Thin Man (band) albums